Ethics and Language is a 1944 book by C. L. Stevenson which was influential in furthering the metaethical view of emotivism first espoused by A. J. Ayer.

References

1944 non-fiction books
Ethics books
Contemporary philosophical literature